Khudyakov (from худой meaning slender) is a Russian masculine surname, its feminine counterpart is Khudyakova. It may refer to:

Maxim Khudyakov (born 1986), Kazakhstani ice hockey forward
Nataliya Khudyakova (born 1985), Ukrainian swimmer
Roman Khudyakov (born 1977), politician from Transnistria
Sergei Khudyakov (1902–1950), Soviet Armenian Marshal of the aviation
Vasily Khudyakov (1825-1871), Russian painter

See also
Arakcheev and Khudyakov case

Russian-language surnames